Crambus isshiki is a moth in the family Crambidae. It was described by Shōnen Matsumura in 1925. It is found in Russia, where it has been recorded from southern Sakhalin, Ussuri and Amur. It has also been recorded from China (Manchuria).

References

Crambini
Moths described in 1925
Moths of Asia